Profiles is Pink Floyd drummer Nick Mason's second studio album and 10cc guitarist Rick Fenn's debut studio album. It was released on 29 July 1985 by Harvest Records. The album (along with Nick Mason's Fictitious Sports and the soundtrack to the film White of the Eye) was remastered and reissued on 31 August 2018 as part of the box set Unattended Luggage.

Songs
The album is almost entirely instrumental, save for two songs; "Lie for a Lie", featuring Pink Floyd's lead vocalist and guitarist David Gilmour with singer Maggie Reilly, and "Israel", sung by UFO keyboardist Danny Peyronel.

Track listing
All tracks written by Rick Fenn and Nick Mason, except as noted.

Side one
 "Malta" – 6:00
 "Lie for a Lie" (Fenn, Mason, Danny Peyronel) – 3:16
 "Rhoda" – 3:22
 "Profiles Part 1/Profiles Part 2" – 9:58

Side two
"Israel" (Fenn, Peyronel) – 3:30
 "And the Address" – 2:45
 "Mumbo Jumbo" – 3:53
 "Zip Code" – 3:05
 "Black Ice" – 3:37
 "At the End of the Day"  – 2:35
 "Profiles Part 3" – 1:55

Non-album track
"Lie for a Lie" (Fenn, Mason, Peyronel) (12" Mix) – 5:54

Personnel
Credits are adapted from the Profiles liner notes.

Musicians
 Nick Mason — drums, keyboards, percussion, composing
 Rick Fenn — guitars, keyboards, composing
 Mel Collins — saxophone on "Rhoda", "And the Address", "Mumbo Jumbo", and "Black Ice"
 David Gilmour — vocals on "Lie for a Lie"
 Maggie Reilly — vocals on "Lie for a Lie"
 Danny Peyronel — vocals on "Israel"
 Craig Pruess — emulator brass on "Malta"
 Aja Fenn — keyboard intro on "Malta"

References

External links
 

1985 albums
Harvest Records albums
EMI Records albums
Columbia Records albums
Albums produced by Nick Mason
Nick Mason albums